Werner Ipta (18 March 1942 – 22 February 2019) was a football player who was active in the Bundesliga in Germany from 1968 to 1970.

Career
His debut was on Christmas Day in 1960 with FC Schalke 04, where he contributed to the 3–1 win against SF Hamborn 07. He continued to play the rest of the year and had a total of three seasons with the Royal Blues. During these years, Schalke placed third, second and sixth. He scored a total of 16 goals and achieved 49 caps for Schalke. He then played for Bayern Munich in the Regionalliga Süd for one year, contributing to their second-place finish. He then moved to the Grasshoppers Zurich. After two years in Switzerland he came back to Germany to spend his remaining career in Berlin. He spent four years with Hertha BSC's first XI and played then for two years for Tasmania 1900 Berlin in the Stadtliga Berlin (City League Berlin).

References

External links 
 

1942 births
2019 deaths
Bundesliga players
FC Schalke 04 players
FC Bayern Munich footballers
Grasshopper Club Zürich players
Hertha BSC players
Association football midfielders
German footballers
20th-century German people